The 2016–17 New Mexico State Aggies men's basketball team represented New Mexico State University during the 2016–17 NCAA Division I men's basketball season. The Aggies, led by first-year head coach Paul Weir, played their home games at the Pan American Center in Las Cruces, New Mexico as members of the Western Athletic Conference. They finished the season 28–6, 11–3 in WAC play to finish in a tie for second place. They defeated Chicago State, UMKC, and Cal State Bakersfield to win the WAC tournament. As a result, they received the conference's automatic bid to the NCAA tournament where they lost in the first round to Baylor.

On April 11, 2017, head coach Paul Weir resigned to become the head coach at New Mexico. On April 17, the school hired Chris Jans as head coach.

Previous season 
The Aggies finished the 2015–16 season 23–11, 13–1 in WAC play to win the WAC regular season championship. They defeated UMKC to advance to the championship game of the WAC tournament where they lost to Cal State Bakersfield. As a regular season conference champion who failed to win their conference tournament, they received an automatic bid to the National Invitation Tournament where they lost in the first round to Saint Mary's.

On April 16, 2016, head coach Marvin Menzies left the school to accept the head coaching position at UNLV. On April 26, the school hired Paul Weir, an assistant coach under Menzies, as head coach.

Departures

Incoming Transfers

2016 Recruiting Class

Roster

Schedule and results

|-
!colspan=9 style=| Regular season

|-
!colspan=9 style=| WAC tournament

|-
!colspan=9 style=| NCAA tournament

References

New Mexico State Aggies men's basketball seasons
New Mexico State
New Mexico State
Aggies
Aggies